Hiatula is a genus of bivalve molluscs in the family Psammobiidae, known as sunset shells.

Species in the genus Soletellina
 Hiatula acuta
 Hiatula adamsii
 Hiatula ambigua
 Hiatula amianta
 Hiatula atrata
 Hiatula biradiata
 Hiatula boeddinghausi
 Hiatula burnupi
 Hiatula capensis
 Hiatula chinensis
 Hiatula clouei
 Hiatula connectens
 Hiatula consobrina
 Hiatula diphos
 Hiatula gibbonsi
 Hiatula lunulata
 Hiatula nitida
 Hiatula ovalis
 Hiatula petalina
 Hiatula rosea
 Hiatula siliquens
 Hiatula tumens

References
http://www.marinespecies.org/aphia.php?p=taxdetails&id=516226

Psammobiidae
Bivalve genera